Carola Casale (born 7 November 1998) is an Italian karateka. She is a two-time European champion in the women's team kata event at the European Karate Championships. She won one of the bronze medals in the women's team kata event at the 2021 World Karate Championships held in Dubai, United Arab Emirates.

She lost her bronze medal match in the women's kata event at the 2022 World Games held in Birmingham, United States.

References

External links
 Carola Casale at LesSports.info

1998 births
Living people
Italian female karateka
Karateka of Fiamme Oro
Competitors at the 2022 World Games
20th-century Italian women
21st-century Italian women